Philippe Clement (born 22 March 1974) is a Belgian professional football coach and former player who is the manager of Ligue 1 club Monaco. Born in Antwerp, he played as a defensive midfielder for clubs including Beerschot, Genk, Coventry City, and Club Brugge. Clement played 38 times with Belgium national team and was in the team for the 1998 World Cup and Euro 2000. 

As a manager, he has won three consecutive Belgian Pro League titles, with Genk in 2018–19 and with Club Brugge in 2019–20 and 2020–21. He was appointed as head coach of Monaco in January 2022.

Career statistics

Club

International

Managerial statistics

Honours

Player
Genk
Belgian Cup: 1997–98

Club Brugge
Belgian First Division: 2002–03, 2004–05
Belgian Cup: 2001–02, 2003–04, 2006–07
Belgian Super Cup: 2002, 2003, 2004, 2005

Manager
Genk
Belgian Pro League: 2018–19
Club Brugge
Belgian Pro League: 2019–20, 2020–21
Belgian Super Cup: 2021
Individual
Belgian Manager of the Season: 2018–19
Belgian Best Coach of the Year: 2019, 2020
Raymond Goethals Award: 2018, 2019

References

External links
 
 
 

1974 births
Living people
Belgian footballers
Belgian expatriate footballers
K. Beerschot V.A.C. players
K.R.C. Genk players
Coventry City F.C. players
Club Brugge KV players
Beerschot A.C. players
K.R.C. Genk managers
Club Brugge KV head coaches
AS Monaco FC managers
Association football central defenders
Belgian Pro League players
Premier League players
Expatriate footballers in England
Belgian expatriate sportspeople in England
Belgium international footballers
1998 FIFA World Cup players
UEFA Euro 2000 players
Footballers from Antwerp
Association football defenders
Belgian football managers
Club Brugge KV non-playing staff